Hrvatski Odbojkaški Klub Domaljevac  is a volleyball club from Domaljevac, Bosnia and Herzegovina. It currently competes in the Premier League, the top tier volleyball league of Bosnia and Herzegovina.

History
The club was founded 1980 as OK Mladost.
In 2020 they won the Cup of Federation of Bosnia and Herzegovina, the second tier volleyball cup of Bosnia and Herzegovina.

They play their matches in the sports hall of the high school in Orašje, due to the lack of an arena in Domaljevac.

Honours
Bosnia and Herzegovina Championship:
 Runner-up (2): 2021, 2022
Volleyball Cup of Bosnia and Herzegovina:
 Runner-up (3): 2017, 2021, 2022
Volleyball Cup of Federation of Bosnia and Herzegovina:
Winners (1): 2020

Recent seasons
The recent season-by-season performance of the club:

Notable players
  Tomislav Čošković
  Marko Matić
  Pero Stanić

Coaching history

 Đuro Kesić
 Mijo Leovac
 Anto Tepeluk
 Anto Kobaš
 Leo Barić
 Pero Stanić
 Ivan Mijić
 Zlatko Ivić

References

Volleyball clubs established in 1980
Domaljevac, HOK
Domaljevac, HOK